Tropasteron is a genus of spiders in the family Zodariidae. It was first described in 2003 by Baehr. , it contains 22 species, all found in Queensland.

Species
Tropasteron comprises the following species:
Tropasteron andreae Baehr, 2003
Tropasteron cardwell Baehr, 2003
Tropasteron cleveland Baehr, 2003
Tropasteron cooki Baehr, 2003
Tropasteron daviesae Baehr, 2003
Tropasteron eacham Baehr, 2003
Tropasteron fox Baehr, 2003
Tropasteron halifax Baehr, 2003
Tropasteron heatherae Baehr, 2003
Tropasteron julatten Baehr, 2003
Tropasteron luteipes Baehr, 2003
Tropasteron magnum Baehr, 2003
Tropasteron malbon Baehr, 2003
Tropasteron monteithi Baehr, 2003
Tropasteron palmerston Baehr, 2003
Tropasteron pseudomagnum Baehr, 2003
Tropasteron raveni Baehr, 2003
Tropasteron robertsi Baehr, 2003
Tropasteron splendens Baehr, 2003
Tropasteron thompsoni Baehr, 2003
Tropasteron tribulation Baehr, 2003
Tropasteron yeatesi Baehr, 2003

References

Zodariidae
Araneomorphae genera
Spiders of Australia